Chloroclystis inaequata is a moth in the  family Geometridae. It is found in the north-eastern Himalayas and on Java and Bali.

Subspecies
Chloroclystis inaequata inaequata
Chloroclystis inaequata scotosema Prout, 1937

References

Moths described in 1896
Chloroclystis
Moths of Asia